Giorgi Khuroshvili (Georgian: გიორგი ხუროშვილი; born November 4, 1988) is a Georgian philosopher.

Biography 
Giorgi Khuroshvili was born in 1988, Tbilisi, Georgia. In 2006–2010 he studied Law (B.A.) and Political sciences (M.A.) at Grgiol Robakidze University (Georgia). In 2014–2016 he was a doctoral student of Political Sciences at Adam Mickiewicz University in Poznań (Poland). In 2017 he received his PhD in Philosophy from Grgiol Robakidze University for doctoral thesis "Jerusalem and Athens as a Paradigm on Intercultural Philosophy" supervised by Tengiz Iremadze and Helmut Schneider. Since 2012 he is a research fellow at the Institute of Philosophy and Social Sciences (Tbilisi). Since 2015 he is a research fellow at the Archive of Caucasian Philosophy and Theology of New Georgian University, in 2017-2021 he was an associate professor of philosophy at the same university, in spring 2017 he was a visiting professor at Lazarski University (Warsaw, Poland). Since 2021 Khuroshvili is a professor of philosophy at New Georgian University.

Work 
Giorgi Khuroshvili is a member of the editorial board of the academic book series "Philosophy, Sociology, Media Theory", the co-editor of the book series "Philosophy and Social Theory" of the German publishing house "Logos"(Berlin), the editor-in-chief of the Encyclopedia of Georgian Philosophy and Theology, and Editor-in-Chief of the online academic platform Petritsi Portal.

Giorgi Khuroshvili's work is focused on political philosophy, political theory, Christian philosophy, history of Georgian philosophy and intercultural philosophy. In addition, he has translated and published the works of Francis Bacon, Hannah Arendt, Leo Strauss, Thomas Jefferson, Benjamin Franklin, John Adams, Benjamin Rush, James Wilson, Kallistos Ware, Christos Yannaras, John Zizioulas into Georgian language.

Selected publications

Books 

 Political Theology in Medieval Georgia. Pavoriti Stili, Tbilisi, 2022. ISBN 978-9941-8-4907-7 

 Plato in Al-Farabi`s Political Philosophy. Scientific series: East and West. Dialogue between the Cultures, vol. 8, Nekeri, Tbilisi, 2017. 
 Jerusalem and Athens. Intercultural and interdisciplinary Context. East and West. Dialogue between the Cultures, vol. 4, Nekeri, Tbilisi, 2015. 
 (Co-author) Essays in Political Philosophy, vol. I, Tbilisi: "Nekeri", 2016; vol. II, Tbilisi: "Nekeri", 2017. 
 (Co-author) Philosophy and Theology in Medieval Georgia, Tbilisi: Pavoriti Stili, 2016. 
 (Co-author) Early Modern Georgian Philosophy and its Major Representatives, Tbilisi: Pavoriti Stili, 2014. 
 (Co-author) Philosophical Urbanism, Tbilisi: Publishing House “Nekeri”, 2014.

Articles 

 Philosophy in Independent Georgia, in: Philosophy Unchained. Developments in Post-Soviet Philosophical Thought. Edited by M. Minakov. Foreword by Ch. Donohue, ibidem Press, 2023. pp. 101-121.
 Christian Platonism of Clement of Alexandria, in: At the Origins of Christian Philosophy: Clement of Alexandria, The Cappadocian Fathers, Gaius Marius Victorinus, St. Augustine, Boethius. Ed., by T. Iremadze, H. Schneider, G. Khuroshvili. "Pavoroti Stili", Tbilisi, 2019. pp. 16–25.
 The Dispute Between Bruno Bauer and David Friedrich Strauss Over the Interpretation of Hegel`s Religious Conception, in: Hegel's Philosophy of Religion. Ed., by T. Iremadze, "Pavoroti Stili", Tbilisi, 2019. pp. 185–202
 Conceptions of Political Thought in Medieval Georgia: David IV “the Builder”, Arson of Ikalto. In: Veritas et subtilitas. Truth and Subtlety in the History of Philosophy. John Benjamins Publishing Company. Amsterdam/Philadelphia 2018. pp. 149–156.
 Conflict of the Cities of God and Man in St. Augustine, in: St. Augustine – Teacher of Christianity. Ed., by: T. Iremadze, "Pavoroti Stili", Tbilisi, 2017. pp. 176–185.
 Origins of Hannah Arendt`s Political Thought, in: Hannah Arendt, What is Authority? Translated by Giorgi Khuroshvili. Editors: Tengiz Iremadze, Giorgi Tavadze, etc. Nekeri, Tbilisi, 2015. pp. 7–15.
 Jerusalem and Athens in Medieval Georgian Thought, in: Philosophie und Sozialtheorie, Band 1, Leben verstehen. Herausgegeben von Tengiz Iremadze, Udo Reinhold Jeck,     Helmut Schneider. Logos Verlag, Berlin, 2014. S. 97–101.
 Between Plato and Biblical Prophets – Hermann Cohen and Leo Strauss on Jerusalem and Athens, in: East and West (Materials of the International Scientific Conference Dedicated to the 60-year Anniversary of Udo Reinhold Jeck). Editors: Tengiz Iremadze, Guram Tevzadze. “Nekeri,” Tbilisi, 2012, pp. 153–160.

References

External links 

 National Parliamentary Library of Georgia
 Khuroshvili, Conceptions of political thought in medieval Georgia
 Biographical Dictionary
 Lecture of Dr. Giorgi Khuroshvili
 Philosophical Conversations
The world lecture project

21st-century philosophers
Philosophers from Georgia (country)
1988 births
Political philosophers
Living people